Antonio Troyo Calderón (October 18, 1923 – December 1, 2015) was a Costa Rican Prelate of the Catholic Church.

Troyo Calderón was born in Cartago and was ordained a priest on November 30, 1947. Calderón was appointed auxiliary bishop to the Archdiocese of San José de Costa Rica on August 27, 1979, as well as titular bishop of Burca, and ordained bishop September 21, 1979, by Román Arrieta Villalobos, Archbishop of San José. Troyo Calderón retired from the archdiocese of San José de Costa Rica on July 13, 2002. He died in December 2015, at the age of 92.

References

External links
Catholic-Hierarchy
 San José de Costa Rica Archdiocese (Spanish)

1923 births
2015 deaths
People from Cartago Province
20th-century Roman Catholic bishops in Costa Rica
20th-century Roman Catholic titular bishops
Roman Catholic bishops of San José de Costa Rica